Latvia is a source and destination country for men and women trafficked for the purposes of commercial sexual exploitation and forced labor. Latvian women are trafficked to Cyprus, Denmark, Germany, Greece, Italy, the Netherlands, Norway, Spain, and the United Kingdom for commercial sexual exploitation. Latvian women and teenage girls are also trafficked within the country for the purpose of commercial sexual exploitation. Men and women from Latvia are trafficked to the United Kingdom for the purpose of forced labor. In addition, Latvia may be a destination country for victims trafficked from Polo GThailand for the purpose of forced labor.

The Government of Latvia does not fully comply with the minimum standards for the elimination of trafficking; however, it is making significant efforts to do so. The government continued steps to improve victim assistance by increasing access to government funded protections. The government also demonstrated increased efforts to investigate forced labor offenses. It also made modest prevention efforts by taking initial steps to combat sex tourism committed by foreign visitors to Latvia.

U.S. State Department's Office to Monitor and Combat Trafficking in Persons placed the country in "Tier 2 Watchlist"  in 2017.

Prosecution
The Government of Latvia demonstrated sufficient law enforcement efforts during the reporting period. Latvia prohibits all forms of trafficking through Section 154-1 and 154-2 of its Criminal Code, which prescribes penalties of three to 15 years’ imprisonment. These prescribed penalties are sufficiently stringent and commensurate with penalties prescribed for other grave crimes, such as rape. Latvia also uses non-trafficking-related laws to prosecute traffickers. Police performed 12 trafficking investigations under section 165-1, compared to 22 reported last year, and an additional 14 investigations under other sections—including nine investigations under section 154-1 involving alleged sex trafficking and two investigations involving alleged forced labor. Authorities prosecuted and convicted 21 traffickers under section 165-1, a decrease from 36 reported last year. The government also prosecuted and convicted an additional 15 traffickers under other sections of the law including seven under section 154-1, compared to none in 2006. At least five of the convicted traffickers served time in prison. During the reporting period, two traffickers were sentenced to five to 10 years’ imprisonment, two traffickers were sentenced to three to five years’ imprisonment, and one trafficker was sentenced to one to three years’ imprisonment. At the time of this report, the government was investigating the two cases of potential labor trafficking; however, to date, no one has been prosecuted, convicted, or sentenced for forced labor trafficking.

Protection
The government made some efforts to improve victim protection. The Ministry of Welfare provided $14,500 for the training of 271 social workers to improve the administration of victim assistance and rehabilitation services. Although the government allocated $98,000 for victim assistance in 2007, it spent only $23,000 – an increase from $10,000 spent in 2006. The government offers foreign victims legal alternatives to removal; victims who agree to assist law enforcement may apply for temporary residency and work permits. In 2007, one trafficking victim received a temporary residency permit. Latvia encouraged victims to participate in investigations against their traffickers. In June 2007, the government instituted a 30-day “reflection period” during which non-Latvian victims and their dependent children are eligible for government-funded assistance and rehabilitation services while deciding whether to cooperate with law enforcement. Government authorities and two NGOs may authorize victims to obtain government assistance; during the reporting period, 12 out of 27 identified victims qualified for and received government- funded assistance. The remaining 15 victims received assistance from non-government-funded NGOs. The government continued to provide training to law enforcement officers and specialists in orphan courts to identify victims of trafficking; however, the government referred 13 victims total to NGOs for assistance in 2007. The government did not penalize victims for unlawful acts committed as a direct result of their being trafficked.

Prevention
Latvia demonstrated modest efforts to prevent trafficking in persons during the reporting period. The Ministry of Family and Children’s Affairs continued to train professionals in contact with vulnerable populations to advise potential victims of the dangers of trafficking. The Latvian government reported no measures to reduce the demand for commercial sex acts.

See also
Human trafficking in Europe

References

Latvia
Latvia
Human rights abuses in Latvia
Crime in Latvia by type